Whiskey Dick Creek is a creek in Douglas County, Washington near the unincorporated community of Palisades.

References

Rivers of Douglas County, Washington